The Netherlands participated in the Junior Eurovision Song Contest 2017 which took place in Tbilisi, Georgia on 26 November 2017. The Dutch broadcaster AVROTROS is responsible for the organisation of their representative at the contest. Their entry was selected through the national selection Junior Songfestival 2017. It consisted of six contestants who were divided into two semifinals, having been broadcast on 2 & 9 September 2017. The final was broadcast on 16 September 2017. The boy band Fource, a quartet consisting of the four boys Jannes, Niels, Max and Ian, were selected as the winners of the national selection. Their song for the contest, "Love Me", was released on 6 October 2017.

Background

Prior to the 2017 Contest, the Netherlands had participated in the Junior Eurovision Song Contest fourteen times since its first entry in 2003. The Netherlands have won the contest on one occasion: in 2009 with the song "Click Clack" performed by Ralf Mackenbach. In 2016, the Netherlands placed 8th out of 17 entries with the song "Kisses & Dancin'" performed by the girl band Kisses.

Before Junior Eurovision

Junior Songfestival 2017 
On 7 June 2017, Dutch broadcaster AVROTROS announced that they would return to the televised process Junior Songfestival for the first time since 2015. All shows of the national final were hosted by Romy Monteiro.

Format 
The winner was decided by a jury, and unlike in previous years, the artists performed covers instead of the final songs.  The Dutch broadcaster revealed the three jury members on 24 August 2017. The main jury, consisting of Kim-Lian van der Meij (JESC 2007 and 2012 host), Tim Douwsma, and Sharon Doorson selected one qualifier from each semifinal. Additionally, here was also a wildcard jury made up of former Dutch Junior Eurovision contestants who were responsible for selecting an extra qualifier from the semifinals. The members of the wildcard jury were: Ralf Mackenbach (who represented Netherlands in the Junior Eurovision Song Contest 2009 and won the contest), Mylène & Rosanne (who represented Netherlands in the Junior Eurovision Song Contest 2013), and members of Kisses (the band which represented Netherlands in the Junior Eurovision Song Contest 2016)

Semi-finals
The semi-finals were broadcast on 2 and 9 September 2017. The acts picked directly by the jury to qualify to the Junior Songfestival final were Sezina and Fource, with Montana being chosen as the third qualifier by the wildcard jury. In addition to their competition performances, before the results were announced, the participants of the first semi-final performed “Let’s Go” by Ali B, Kenny B and Brace, and the participants of the second semi-final performed “Hart Beat” by Rein van Duivenboden & Vajèn van den Bosch.

Final
The final was broadcast on 16 September 2017. Before the final results were announced, all of the year's contestants reunited to perform "Later als ik groter ben" by BLØF. The final of Junior Songfestival 2017 was the most watched program broadcast on NPO3 of the day, with a total share of 1.3% of viewers. The show failed to enter the top twenty five most viewed programs of the day in the Netherlands, falling over 160,000 viewers short of twenty fifth place. The viewing figures fell from the second semi-final of the competition: in total 28,000 less viewers tuned in to watch the final, with viewing share also reducing by 0.2%. The season was the least watched in the history of Junior Songfestival.

Song selection 
On 27 September, a 19-second snippet of the song "Love Me" was published, containing the chorus. The official music video and the full song were published on 6 October 2017. The song was composed by Stas Swaczyna & Joost Griffioen, also known as The Rocketeers. Joost Griffioen also wrote the lyrics to the song. The Rocketeers also worked together with Julia on the Dutch Junior Eurovision 2014 entry "Around". The chorus is completely in English while the rest of the song is in Dutch. The filming for the video was done by Framez Productions and took place in several locations around Amsterdam, such as Vondelpark, the Prinsengracht Canal and the Dam Square.

Artist and song information

Fource

Together Max Mies (born 6 January 2003), Jannes Heuvelmans (born 4 April 2003), Niels Schlimback (born 12 April 2005) and Ian Kuyper (born 4 April 2004) make Fource. Their song, "Love Me", was revealed on 6 October.

At Junior Eurovision
During the opening ceremony and the running order draw which both took place on 20 November 2017, the Netherlands was drawn to perform in position 3 on 26 November 2017, following Poland and preceding Armenia.

Voting

The Netherlands was ninth after the jury vote with a total of 44 points. The Netherlands however were tops with the online voting with 112 points. They finished fourth overall with a total of 156 points: their best JESC finish since 2011.

Thijs Schlimback, older brother of Fource member Niels Schlimback, was the spokesperson declaring the results of the Dutch jury.

Detailed voting results

References

Netherlands
2017
Junior Eurovision Song Contest